Dor Badam (also Romanized as Dor Bādām and Durb Ādam) is a village in Dowlatkhaneh Rural District, Bajgiran District, Quchan County, Razavi Khorasan Province, Iran. At the 2006 census, its population was 286, in 70 families.

References 

Populated places in Quchan County